James Lee (born August 17, 1985) is a professional Canadian football offensive tackle for the Ottawa Redblacks of the Canadian Football League. He was signed by the Cleveland Browns as an undrafted free agent in 2008. He played college football at South Carolina State.

Lee has also been a member of the Tampa Bay Buccaneers, Washington Redskins, and Saskatchewan Roughriders.

Professional career

Cleveland Browns
Lee signed with the Cleveland Browns on April 29, 2008. He was waived on August 30, 2008.

Tampa Bay Buccaneers
On September 1, 2008, Lee signed with the Tampa Bay Buccaneers. He was waived on September 5, 2008 and signed to the team's practice squad the next day. Lee was promoted to the 53-man active roster on October 27, 2008.

On July 29, 2011, Lee re-signed with the Buccaneers as a restricted free agent.

Washington Redskins
Lee was signed by the Washington Redskins on April 9, 2012 as an unrestricted free agent. He was released on August 27.

References

External links
Ottawa RedBlacks bio

1985 births
Living people
Players of American football from Florida
American football offensive tackles
South Carolina State Bulldogs football players
Cleveland Browns players
Tampa Bay Buccaneers players
Washington Redskins players